Kiril Manolov is a Bulgarian operatic baritone with an international career performing leading roles in the opera houses and opera festivals in Europe,US and Japan.

He is particularly known for his portrayal of the title role in Verdi's Falstaff but he also is great Nabucco-"Nabucco", Simon-"Simon Boccanegra", Amonasro-"Aida", Rigoletto-"Rigoletto", Don Carlos di Vargas-"La forza del destino".

Life and career
Born Kiril Manolov Todorov in Sofia, he was educated at the Bulgarian State Academy of Music and made his debut in 1998 as Don Giovanni in Don Giovanni. He did further vocal study in Milan and in Vienna ]. 

Manolov sang as a soloist for the National Opera and Ballet of Bulgaria for several years and went on to become a regular guest soloist at the Croatian National Theatres in Zagreb and Split. He has since returned several times to the National Opera in Sofia, including performances as Amonasro in Aida (2012) and the title role in Nabucco (2011). Since 2010 he has been a regular soloist at the Hessisches Staatstheater Wiesbaden, appearing as Miller in Luisa Miller and in the title roles of Il barbiere di Siviglia, Simon Boccanegra,"Falstaff" and Don Pasquale amongst others.

Sir John Falstaff in Verdi's Falstaff has been one of Manolov's signature roles. He sang the role for his house debuts at the Hamburg Staatsoper (2010), the Hungarian State Opera (2013), and the Deutsche Oper Berlin (2014).  It was also the role in which he made his Italian debut at the Ravenna Festival in 2013. The Ravenna production with Manolov as Falstaff, subsequently toured to Ferrara and other Italian cities and was revived at Ravenna in July 2015, conducted by Riccardo Muti, who brought the production and singers to Spain for performances at Oviedo's Teatro Campoamor later that month.

Awards 
Manolov's awards include:

2006 - First Prize, in the 1st Ghena Dimitrova National Competition for Young Singers. The competition was founded in Dimitrova's honour following her death in 2005.
2009 - Gold Medal and "Gold Ring of Sofia" in the 14th Boris Christoff International Competition For Young Opera Singers. The "Gold Ring of Sofia" is the Grand Prix of the competition and is awarded to only a few singers. Manolov was the first singer to have received the award since 1992.

References

External links

Kiril Manolov Operabase

1976 births
Living people
Operatic baritones
21st-century Bulgarian male opera singers
Musicians from Sofia